Hubertus (Huub) Rothengatter (born 8 October 1954) is a former racing driver from the Netherlands.  He participated in 30 Formula One (F1) Grands Prix, debuting on 17 June 1984.  He scored no championship points. He drove for Spirit, Osella and Zakspeed, and his drives all either started or became available midseason. He tried to get Dutch sponsors in various ways, such as by putting a one-page advertisement in De Telegraaf newspaper. Reputedly, when Niki Lauda was asked about him, he referred to him as "rattengott" – literally "God of the rats".

Rothengatter, unlike many fringe drivers who waited for phone calls from F1 teams that never came, attracted personal sponsorship which allowed him to 'buy' his place in the low-budget teams, bringing in much needed money to them and allowing him to drive F1 when he otherwise would most likely have missed out.

Rothengatter later entered into sports management, as a manager for Dutch F1 driver Jos Verstappen.

He is co-founder of EVBox.

Racing record

Complete European Formula Two Championship results
(key) (Races in bold indicate pole position; races in italics indicate fastest lap)

Complete World Sportscar Championship results
(key) (Races in bold indicate pole position) (Races in italics indicate fastest lap)

Complete Formula One results
(key)

References

Sources
F1 Rejects biography

1954 births
Living people
Dutch racing drivers
Dutch Formula One drivers
Spirit Formula One drivers
Osella Formula One drivers
Zakspeed Formula One drivers
European Formula Two Championship drivers
People from Bussum
Sportspeople from North Holland

Alan Docking Racing drivers